Hopewell is a settlement in Manchester Parish, Jamaica.

References

Populated places in Manchester Parish